Merrick Pond is a small lake southwest of Rock Rift in Delaware County, New York. It drains east via Read Creek which flows into the East Branch Delaware River. Perkins Pond is located west and Trask Pond is located east of Merrick Pond.

See also
 List of lakes in New York

References 

Lakes of New York (state)
Lakes of Delaware County, New York